Norma Marian Beecroft (born 11 April 1934) is a Canadian composer, producer, broadcaster, and arts administrator. A member of the Canadian League of Composers and an associate of the Canadian Music Centre, she twice won the Canada Council's Lynch-Staunton Award for composition. She has been commissioned to write works for such organizations as the Atlantic Symphony Orchestra, the Canadian Broadcasting Corporation, the Canadian Electronic Ensemble, The Music Gallery, the National Arts Centre Orchestra, the National Ballet of Canada, the Quebec Contemporary Music Society, the Toronto Symphony Orchestra, and York Winds among others. She is an honorary member of the Canadian Electroacoustic Community and has served on the juries of the SOCAN Awards and the Jules Léger Prize for New Chamber Music. In 1988 she donated many of her original manuscripts, papers, and recordings to the library at the University of Calgary.

Early life and education
Born in Oshawa, Beecroft is the daughter of Julian Beecroft, a musician and inventor who was a pioneer in the development of electronic tape, and actress Eleanor Beecroft (née Chambers). She received her earliest musical education from her parents, both of whom had a significant amount of musical training. Her father had originally intended to pursue a career as a concert pianist and had performed in concerts in his early 20s. His career, however, was cut short when he lost three of his fingers in a tragic woodworking accident. Her parents married in 1931 and their marriage produced four other children besides Norma. They divorced in 1947 when she was 13 years old.

In 1950 Beecroft began taking private piano lessons with Aladar Ecsedy, studying with him until she entered The Royal Conservatory of Music (RCMT) in 1952. She attended classes at the RCMT through 1958 where her professors included Gordon Hallett (piano), Weldon Kilburn (piano), and John Weinzweig (music theory and composition). In 1957-1958 she studied the flute privately with Keith Girard and in the summer of 1958 was a pupil at the Berkshire Music Center where she studied composition with Aaron Copland and Lukas Foss.

In 1959 Beecroft went to Rome to pursue graduate studies in composition with Goffredo Petrassi at the Accademia Nazionale di Santa Cecilia. She remained in that city through 1962 where she also continued studies in the flute privately with Severino Gazzelloni. In the summers of 1960 and 1961 she attended lectures taught by Bruno Maderna in Darmstadt, Germany and at the Dartington School in England. In 1962 she returned to Canada to pursue courses in electronic music at the University of Toronto with Myron Schaeffer. After completing these studies, she went to New York City to work with Mario Davidovsky at the Columbia-Princeton Electronic Music Center in 1964.

Career
Beecroft began her career working as a script assistant for television music programs for the Canadian Broadcasting Corporation from 1954-1957. From 1956-1957 she served as the president of Canadian Music Associates, the Toronto concert committee of the Canadian League of Composers. She continued to work for the CBC in a variety of capacities, including music consultant (1957–1959), script assistant (1962–1963), talent relations officer (1963–1964), and national program organizer for radio (1964–1966). From 1966-1969 she was a producer for CBC Radio for such programs as Organists in Recital, RSVP, and From the Age of Elegance. She also hosted and produced the program Music of Today during these years and, after resigning as a producer at CBC in 1969, continued to host and commentate for that program in the 1970s. She also served as the president of Ten Centuries Concerts from 1965-1968.

She is among a generation of pioneering professional electronic music composers. From 1967 to 1976 she worked independently in the Electronic Music Studio inside the Edward Johnson Building (UTEMS) of the University of Toronto, Faculty of Music.
 Because of her reputation as a composer she was one of the first non-students to be able to experiment in the new facility. There she focused on multitrack recording and looping as an extension of existing instrumental or vocal sounds. Her podcast Conversations With Post World War II Pioneers of Electronic Music features some of the fellow composers around that time. 

During the 1970s, Beecroft was busy working as a freelance radio producer, notably creating numerous documentaries for CBC Radio on Canadian composers like Jean Coulthard, Harry Freedman, Bruce Mather, Barbara Pentland, Harry Somers, Gilles Tremblay, and John Weinzweig among others. She also created documentaries on composers Murray Adaskin and Violet Archer for CJRT-FM. In 1975 she put together 13 broadcast records entitled Music Canada that contained music taken from recordings in the collections at the libraries of Radio Canada International and the Composers, Authors and Publishers Association of Canada. In 1976 she won the Major Armstrong Award for excellence in FM broadcasting for her documentary The Computer in Music. She later produced electronic music scores for William Shakespeare's Macbeth (1982) and A Midsummer Night's Dream (1983) at the Stratford Festival.

In 1971 Beecroft co-founded the New Music Concerts (NMC) with composer and flutist Robert Aitken. The NMC was founded with the purpose of providing a performance venue for new music 
as well as providing performers with opportunities to further master modern performance techniques. Beecroft served as the organization's president through 1989. She was a member of the music faculty at York University from 1984-1987 where she taught classes in electronic music and composition. She has since returned there as a guest lecturer and worked in that capacity at the University of Montreal as well.

References

Further reading
Beecroft, Norma. “Electronic Music in Toronto and Canada in the Analogue Era.” eContact! 11.2 — Figures canadiennes 2 + TES 2008 / Canadian Figures 2 + TES 2008 (July 2009). Montréal: CEC.

1934 births
Living people
Accademia Nazionale di Santa Cecilia alumni
Canadian arts administrators
Women arts administrators
Canadian composers
The Royal Conservatory of Music alumni
University of Toronto alumni
Academic staff of York University
Pupils of Lukas Foss
Canadian women in electronic music
Canadian women composers